Kathryn Miles (Born Peoria, Illinois in 1974) is an American journalist, writer, and environmental theorist. She is the author of three books including Superstorm: Nine Days Inside Hurricane Sandy, All Standing and Adventures with Ari.

Background 
Miles grew up in the Midwest of the United States and worked as a cub reporter for Journal Star in Peoria, Illinois. She attended college at Saint Louis University. Miles originally enrolled as a pre-law student but soon switched to Philosophy and English. She received a PhD in literary theory but said that "criticism didn't quite fit right either," and so she returned to journalism, her first love.

Academic career 
Miles served as professor of Environmental Writing at Unity College from 2001-2013. In 2014 Miles was on the faculty of the MFA program at Chatham University and works as writer-in-residence for Green Mountain College in Poultney, Vermont.

Writer 
Kathryn Miles sold her first book, Adventures with Ari, to Skyhorse Publishing. It was named a "notable book" by Bark Magazine. Her second book, All Standing: The Remarkable Story of the Jeanie Johnston, The Legendary Irish Famine Ship was published by Simon & Schuster in 2013. The book chronicles the story of the Jeanie Johnston, which Miles called "the world's luckiest ship" in an interview on NPR.  In 2014 she wrote Superstorm: Nine Days Inside Hurricane Sandy, which was "the first complete moment-by-moment account of the largest Atlantic storm on record.".  Miles' essays and articles have appeared in publications including Best American Essays, History, Outside", "Popular Mechanics and Terrain.  Her investigation into the sinking of the Bounty which first appeared in Outside, was named one of the best long reads of 2013 by the Daily Beast. and a "notable narrative" by Harvard University's Nieman Journalism Foundation. Her most recent book is Quakeland: On the Road to America's Next Devastating Earthquake, a study of the history, and future potential, of earthquakes in America.

Bibliography 
Quakeland: On the Road to America's Next Devastating Earthquake, Dutton, 2017. , 
Superstorm: Nine Days Inside Hurricane Sandy, Dutton, 2014. , 
All Standing: The Remarkable Story of the Jeanie Johnston, the Legendary Irish Famine Ship, Simon & Schuster, 2013. , 
Adventures with Ari, Skyhorse, 2009. , 
Dog is Our Co-Pilot (2009).

References

1974 births
Living people
Saint Louis University alumni
American women writers
Unity College (Maine) faculty
Chatham University faculty
Environmental writers
American women academics
21st-century American women